James Buddy Day is a Canadian director, writer and producer. He is the principal of Pyramid Productions.

Career 
Since 2015, Day has been the showrunner for numerous true crime television documentaries and series including The Shocking Truth, and Sex, Lies & Murder for Pyramid Productions. In 2018, Day co-wrote, co-produced and directed, Casey Anthony: Her Friends Speak, in which key individuals involved in the Casey Anthony trial reunited to recall their tense interviews with police, and the media circus surrounding her high-profile trial in which Casey Anthony faced the death penalty for the death of her daughter Caylee. That same year Day directed Slender Man Stabbing: The Untold Story, which featured the first interviews with many involved in the Slender Man Stabbing in Waukesha, Wisconsin. In 2019, he was the executive producer Oxygen's The Disappearance of Susan Cox Powell with Texas Crew Productions, called the "definitive story" of Susan's final years with "alarming new developments" and "scandalous" never-before-seen videos. There will be rare interviews with family members offering a new, closer look into the shocking case.

In 2021, Day produced and directed the critically acclaimed series Fall River with Blumhouse on Epix. Critic Brian Tellerico wrote, “Epix's Fall River reminded me of how well these kind of long-form investigative journalism pieces can be done.”

Charles Manson 
James Buddy Day wrote to Charles Manson in 2016 and proposed creating a documentary to explore Manson's longstanding claim of innocence. Manson accepted, and when Manson died on November 19, 2017, Day became the last journalist to interview him through a year long series of phone calls, which were the basis for the film Charles Manson: The Final Words. Narrated by musician and director Rob Zombie, the documentary focuses on the Manson family murders told from Manson's perspective using never-before-seen case files, pictures and exclusive interviews with so-called "Manson Family" members, Barbara Hoyt, Catherine Gillies, and Bobby Beausoleil.

The documentary presents an "alternate theory" behind the so-called "Manson Family" crimes, proposing the murders were the result of a series of interconnected events surrounding Charles Manson, in contrast to the Los Angeles District Attorney's theory that the murders were the result of Manson's desire to start a race war he called "Helter Skelter."

The film premiered on REELZ Channel to much acclaim and was awarded the 2017 Audience Award at the Red Rock Film Festival, Best Dramatic Documentary at the Atlanta Docufest 2017, as well as and Official Selection of CUFF.Docs 2017 and the Calgary Underground Film Festival. The film was listed as recommended viewing by both the New York Times and the Washington Post. In 2018, Day directed the documentary Charles Manson: The Funeral for MyEntertainment which documented the legal battle over Manson's remains and subsequent funeral held by Manson's grandson Jason Freeman. In 2019, Day directed a third Manson related film called Manson: The Women for the Oxygen Channel. The documentary featured Lynette "Squeaky" Fromme, Sandra "Blue" Good, Diane "Snake" Lake, and Catherine "Gypsy" Share.

Day wrote a book about his experiences speaking with Charles Manson, and the Manson Family, entitled Hippie Cult Leader: The Last Words of Charles Manson. The book featured Day's conversations with Manson over the last year of Manson's life, during which time Day uncovered an "alternate theory" for the Manson murders that disputes the alleged race-war motive known as Helter Skelter."

Filmography

Feature Length Documentaries 

 The Salvation of Todd Bentley (2015)
Goalie: My Life in the Crease (Co-director) (2015)
Carisa Hendrix: Girl on Fire (2016)

Television Series and Specials 

 Wild Obsession (2012- 2013) 
 Seasons of the Wild (2015)
 Expedition Earth (2016)
 The Shocking Truth (2015 - 2017)
Charles Manson: The Final Words (2018)
Casey Anthony: Her Friends Speak (2018)
Sex, Lies & Murder (2018 - 2019)
Slender Man Stabbing: The Untold Story (2019)
Charles Manson: The Funeral (2019)
 The Disappearance of Susan Cox Powell (2019)
Manson: The Women (2019)
The Disappearance of the Millbrook Twins (2019)
Catching a Serial Killer: Bruce McArthur (2020) 
Florida Man Murders (2021) 
Fall River (2021)

References

External links

Canadian documentary film directors
Canadian documentary film producers
Living people
Year of birth missing (living people)